Dominique Joseph Mathieu, O.F.M. Conv. (Arlon, 13 June 1963) is a Belgian Roman Catholic priest of the Order of Friars Minor Conventual, archbishop of Teheran-Isfahan, Iran.

Vocation
A native from the Belgian Luxembourg, he entered the Order of Friars Minor Conventual at 21, and professed solemn vows on 20 September 1987, receiving his priestly ordination in Damme two years later. Incardinated since 2013 in the Provincial Custody of the East and of the Holy Land, he was appointed Archbishop of Teheran-Isfahan by Pope Francis on 8 January 2021.

References

External links

1963 births
Living people
People from Arlon
21st-century Belgian Roman Catholic priests
21st-century Roman Catholic bishops in Iran
20th-century Belgian Roman Catholic priests